The Sailplane Corporation of America was a US manufacturer of sailplanes founded by Gus Briegleb at a former US Army Airfield at El Mirage Dry Lake in California to market kits and plans of his own designs. The firm's greatest success was the Briegleb BG 12 wooden sailplane, but it also sold plans for Briegleb's earlier, wartime designs.

Aircraft
Briegleb BG-6
Briegleb BG-7
Briegleb BG-8
Briegleb BG 12

See also
Briegleb El Mirage Airfield

References
 Jane's All the World's Aircraft 1977-78 edition, page 612

Defunct aircraft manufacturers of the United States